Meleon is a genus of jumping spiders that was first described by F. R. Wanless in 1984.

Species
 it contains eight species, found only in Africa:
Meleon guineensis (Berland & Millot, 1941) – Guinea, Ivory Coast, Congo
Meleon insulanus Logunov & Azarkina, 2008 – Madagascar
Meleon kenti (Lessert, 1925) (type) – Angola, Southern Africa
Meleon madagascarensis (Wanless, 1978) – Madagascar
Meleon raharizonina Logunov & Azarkina, 2008 – Madagascar
Meleon russata (Simon, 1900) – Madagascar
Meleon solitaria (Lessert, 1927) – West, Central, East Africa
Meleon tsaratanana Logunov & Azarkina, 2008 – Madagascar

References

External links
 Salticidae.org: Diagnostic drawings of all species (with photograph of M. solitaria)

Salticidae genera
Salticidae
Spiders of Africa